Lt. Col. Maharaja Manabendra Shah (26 May 1921 – 5 January 2007) was a member of the 2nd, 3rd, 4th, 10th, 11th, 12th, 13th and 14th Lok Sabha of India. He represented the Tehri Garhwal constituency of Uttarakhand and was a member of the Indian National Congress before joining the Bharatiya Jan Sangh and later the Bharatiya Janata Party (BJP) political party. He became one of the BJP's longest-serving members. Shah was ambassador to Ireland from 1980 to 1983. His daughter-in law Mala Rajya Laxmi Shah was elected to Lok Sabha from the same seat in 2012.

Shah was also the last ruling Maharaja of the Garhwal Kingdom (1946–1949), when Tehri Garhwal princely state acceded to independent India on 1 August 1949. Maharaja Manabendra Shah studied at Government College, Lahore and ICS Camp, Dehradun (Uttaranchal).

References

External links
 Official biographical sketch in Parliament of India website
 Genealogy of Tehri Garhwal (princely state) at Queensland University.

1921 births
2005 deaths
Bharatiya Janata Party politicians from Uttarakhand
India MPs 2004–2009
People from New Tehri
India MPs 1957–1962
Ambassadors of India to Ireland
Lok Sabha members from Uttarakhand
India MPs 1962–1967
India MPs 1967–1970
India MPs 1991–1996
India MPs 1996–1997
India MPs 1998–1999
India MPs 1999–2004
Lok Sabha members from Uttar Pradesh